The 631st Maintenance Company is one of five companies of the 927th Combat Sustainment Support Battalion which is under the MSC of 50th Regional Support Group in the Army National Guard of the United States. Its headquarters are located at Starke, Florida. , the company is commanded by CPT Kevin Wade and First Sergeant Elotro Lewis.

References

Companies of the United States Army National Guard